

Measures of the National Assembly for Wales

|-
| {{|Social Care Charges (Wales) Measure 2010|cyshort=Mesur Codi Ffioedd am Wasanaethau Gofal Cymdeithasol (Cymru) 2010|nawm|2|17-03-2010|maintained=y|url=mesur-codi-ffioedd-am-wasanaeth-gofal-cymdeithasol-cymru-social-care-charges-wales-measure|A Measure of the National Assembly for Wales to make provision for and in connection with the imposition and recovery of charges for the provision of non-residential social care services.|cylong=Mesur gan Gynulliad Cenedlaethol Cymru i wneud darpariaeth ar gyfer ac mewn cysylltiad â gosod ffioedd ac adennill ffioedd am ddarparu gwasanaethau gofal cymdeithasol dibreswyl.}}
|-
| {{|Red Meat Industry (Wales) Measure 2010|cyshort=Mesur Diwydiant Cig Coch (Cymru) 2010|nawm|3|11-05-2010|maintained=y|url=mesur-diwydiant-cig-coch-cymru-red-meat-industry-wales-measure|A Measure of the National Assembly for Wales to make provision about imposing a levy in relation to the red meat industry in Wales, and for connected purposes.|cylong=Mesur gan Gynulliad Cenedlaethol Cymru i wneud darpariaeth ynglŷn â gosod ardoll mewn perthynas â'r diwydiant cig coch yng Nghymru, ac at ddibenion cysylltiedig.}}
|-
| {{|National Assembly for Wales (Remuneration) Measure 2010|cyshort=Mesur Cynulliad Cenedlaethol Cymru (Taliadau) 2010|nawm|4|21-07-2010|maintained=y|url=mesur-cynulliad-cenedlaethol-cymru-taliadau-national-assembly-for-wales-remuneration-measure|A Measure of the National Assembly for Wales to establish a National Assembly for Wales Remuneration Board, to transfer to that Board the functions of making determinations in relation to the remuneration of Assembly members, the First Minister, Welsh Ministers, the Counsel General and Deputy Welsh Ministers, and for connected purposes.|cylong=Mesur gan Gynulliad Cenedlaethol Cymru i sefydlu Bwrdd Taliadau Cynulliad Cenedlaethol Cymru, i drosglwyddo i'r Bwrdd hwnnw swyddogaethau gwneud penderfyniadau mewn perthynas â thaliadau aelodau'r Cynulliad, Prif Weinidog Cymru, Gweinidogion Cymru, y Cwnsler Cyffredinol a Dirprwy Weinidogion Cymru, ac at ddibenion sy'n gysylltiedig â hynny.}}
|-
| {{|Carers Strategies (Wales) Measure 2010|cyshort=Mesur Strategaethau ar gyfer Gofalwyr (Cymru) 2010|nawm|5|10-11-2010|maintained=y|url=mesur-strategaethau-ar-gyfer-gofalwyr-cymru-carers-strategies-wales-measure|A Measure of the National Assembly for Wales to make provision for and in connection with the publication and implementation of strategies for the provision of information to, and consultation of, carers.|cylong=Mesur gan Gynulliad Cenedlaethol Cymru i wneud darpariaeth ar gyfer ac mewn cysylltiad â chyhoeddi a gweithredu strategaethau ar gyfer darparu gwybodaeth i ofalwyr ac ymgynghori â hwy.}}
|-
| {{|Playing Fields (Community Involvement in Disposal Decisions) (Wales) Measure 2010|cyshort=Mesur Caeau Chwarae (Ymgysylltiad Cymunedau â Phenderfyniadau Gwaredu) (Cymru) 2010|nawm|6|15-12-2010|maintained=y|url=mesur-caeau-chwarae-ymgysylltiad-cymunedau-phenderfyniadau-gwaredu-cymru-playing-fields-community-involvement-in-disposal-decisions-wales-measure|A Measure of the National Assembly for Wales to make provision in relation to community involvement in decisions by local authorities in Wales whether to dispose of playing fields; and for connected purposes.|cylong=Mesur gan Gynulliad Cenedlaethol Cymru i wneud darpariaeth ynghylch ymgysylltiad cymunedau â phenderfyniadau gan awdurdodau lleol yng Nghymru a ddylid gwaredu caeau chwarae; ac at ddibenion cysylltiedig.}}
|-
| {{|Mental Health (Wales) Measure 2010|cyshort=Mesur Iechyd Meddwl (Cymru) 2010|nawm|7|15-12-2010|maintained=y|url=mesur-iechyd-meddwl-cymru-mental-health-wales-measure|A Measure of the National Assembly for Wales to make provision about primary mental health support services; the coordination of and planning for secondary mental health services; assessments of the needs of former users of secondary mental health services; independent advocacy for persons detained under the Mental Health Act 1983 and other persons who are receiving in-patient hospital treatment for mental health; and for connected purposes.|cylong=Mesur gan Gynulliad Cenedlaethol Cymru i wneud darpariaeth ynghylch gwasanaethau cymorth iechyd meddwl sylfaenol; cydlynu gwasanaethau iechyd meddwl eilaidd a chynllunio ar eu cyfer; asesiadau o anghenion defnyddwyr blaenorol gwasanaethau iechyd meddwl eilaidd; eiriolaeth annibynnol ar gyfer personau a gedwir yn gaeth o dan Ddeddf Iechyd Meddwl 1983 a phersonau eraill sy'n cael triniaeth iechyd meddwl fel claf mewn ysbyty; ac at ddibenion cysylltiedig.}}
|-
| {{|Waste (Wales) Measure 2010|cyshort=Mesur Gwastraff (Cymru) 2010|nawm|8|15-12-2010|maintained=y|url=mesur-gwastraff-cymru-waste-wales-measure|A Measure of the National Assembly for Wales to make provision about the destination of proceeds from charges for single use carrier bags; to make provision about targets to be met by local authorities in relation to waste; to make provision about prohibiting or otherwise regulating the deposit of waste in a landfill; to provide for site waste management plans for works involving construction or demolition; and for connected purposes.|cylong=Mesur gan Gynulliad Cenedlaethol Cymru i wneud darpariaeth ynghylch pen taith enillion o daliadau a godir am fagiau siopa untro; i wneud darpariaeth ynghylch y targedau sydd i'w cyrraedd gan awdurdodau lleol mewn perthynas â gwastraff; i wneud darpariaeth ynghylch gwahardd neu reoleiddio fel arall y weithred o ollwng gwastraff ar safle tirlenwi; i ddarparu ar gyfer cynlluniau rheoli gwastraff safle i weithfeydd sy'n cynnwys adeiladu neu ddymchwel; ac at ddibenion cysylltiedig.}}
}}

References

Wales law-related lists